The Coca-Cola Kaiser Karl European Trophy was a men's senior (over 50) professional golf tournament on the European Seniors Tour, held at the Haus Kambach Golf und Freizeit near Eschweiler, North Rhine-Westphalia in western Germany. It was held just once, in July 2000, and was won by Ian Stanley who finished four shots ahead of Denis Durnian and Seiji Ebihara. The total prize fund was €149,000 with the winner receiving €22,782.

Winners

References

External links
Coverage on the European Senior Tour's official site

Former European Senior Tour events
Golf tournaments in Germany